Trichostema setaceum is an herbaceous flowering plant. Commonly referred to as narrowleaf bluecurls, it is in the 
Lamiaceae (mint family). It grows in sandy soil, sandhills, and rocky uplands.

Description
Stunning purple-blue flowers are borne from September to October.

Conservation
It is listed as endangered in Kentucky, New York, Ohio, and Pennsylvania. It is critically imperiled in Missouri.

References

Endangered plants
Flora of Kentucky
Flora of Missouri
Flora of New York (state)
Flora of Pennsylvania
setaceum
Flora without expected TNC conservation status